Leymus arenarius is a psammophilic (sand-loving) species of grass in the family Poaceae, native to the coasts of Atlantic and Northern Europe. Leymus arenarius is commonly known as sand ryegrass, sea lyme grass, or simply lyme grass.

Taxonomy
Leymus arenarius originated from the hybridization of L. racemosus and another unknown species in central Eurasia or from a polyploidization event. DNA analysis shows that inland and coastal plants are statistically not different from each other. L. arenarius is a recent cultivar, and has had little time to accumulate genetic differences. Leymus arenarius is much younger than its North American relative L. mollis, which has been around since the ice age. Icelandic L. arenarius is molecularly uniform. Polish L. arenarius is also reported to be molecularly uniform.

Distribution
Leymus arenarius is native to the coasts of northern and western Europe. A closely related species Leymus mollis (previously Elymus arenarius ssp. mollis) is native to the northern coasts of North America.

Growth and development

Nitrogen
Leymus arenarius can grow exponentially in terms of height and root growth in the presence of nitrogen. Leymus arenarius is known to take up nitrogen into its root system. Raising nitrogen concentrations can aid in growth as over time plant mass above to surface will not change, but will accumulate in the root system. The roots themselves also retain nitrogen as they come in contact with it and in the surrounding un-vegetated areas. This assists in primary succession with surrounding flora and fauna, and a decrease in soil erosion. After volcanic events L. arenarius causes dunes and their soil depth to grow exponentially over time. Nitrogen increases seed production, raising the yield of seeds as much as 70% in Icelandic L. arenarius. The seed density also increased with the addition of nitrogen, in comparison to phosphorus and potassium which only produce marginal increases for both seed yield and density. Leaf size and density are also influenced by nutrient additions. Removing nitrogen, phosphorus, or potassium resulted in a reduction of leaf mass up to 20%. Nitrogen usage is a cost-effective tool to use to increase abundance and effectiveness of L.arenarius.

Fungi
Leymus arenarius benefits from the presence of arbuscular mycorrhizal fungi. The presence of the fungi increases the ability of L. arenarius to have an extensive root system and to bind soil particles. When adding fungi in its natural habitat, more seeds survived and grew than without the fungi present.

Adaptability
Leymus arenarius can adapt easily to a highly salinized area. When comparing the salt tolerances of the Icelandic populations and the inland populations, the Icelandic populations expressed a higher salt tolerance than the inland populations. The trait for salt tolerance is heritable. The seeds of Icelandic populations germinated more in the presence of a high salt concentration than seeds of the inland population. In Finland the same salinity tolerance is also observed near roadsides where salt is distributed every season during snowfall. The pH near roadsides is closer to the pH present near saltwater beaches.

Immune system
Leymus arenarius has a high immunity to pathogens. In total there are 160 transcripts for antimicrobial peptides present in seedlings. There are 30 transcripts encoding for unique antimicrobial peptides. These are not present in other plant species, and add to the immune system of the plant itself, making it immune to more pathogens than any of its relatives.

Uses
In Europe, the plant's stems are used for roof thatching and can be woven into a coarse fabric. Seeds have provided food in the past. Beginning as early as the 18th century, the plant's extensive network of roots was used in stabilizing sands on northern coastal beaches. In Iceland, the grass was harvested as a wild grain as early as the 12th century.

Law
During the 17th century reign of William III, the Scottish Parliament passed a law protecting Leymus arenarius. Under the 18th century reign of George I, the British Parliament expanded the law to protect the plant on English coasts. This law went as far as declaring the cutting or possession of the grass to be a penal offense.

References

arenarius
Grasses of Europe
Flora of France
Plants described in 1753
Taxa named by Carl Linnaeus